Ocean Park Beach (Spanish: Playa de Ocean Park) is a large public-access beach located in Ocean Park, a neighborhood of the barrio (district) of Santurce in San Juan, Puerto Rico. The beach used to be known as Último Trolley Beach (Playa del Último Trolley), since it was the site of the San Juan–Condado streetcar line terminal. A small section located closed to Dr. José Celso Barbosa Park is still referred to as El Último Trolley.

Description 
Measuring almost 2 miles in length from Punta Piedrita and Parque del Indio in the west to Punta Las Marías in the east, Ocean Park Beach is the largest beach in the municipality of San Juan. Although the largest beach in the area, Ocean Park Beach is not as crowded as Condado Beach as it is more frequented by locals than visitors. This sandy beach is popular for amateur and experienced surfers and windsurfers.

Gallery

See also 
 List of beaches in Puerto Rico

References 

Beaches of Puerto Rico
Tourist attractions in San Juan, Puerto Rico